Fujisaki Station (藤崎駅) is the name of two train stations in Japan:

 Fujisaki Station (Aomori)
 Fujisaki Station (Fukuoka)